Cerothallia is a genus of crustose lichens in the family Teloschistaceae. It has four species, all of which occur in the Southern Hemisphere. The genus was circumscribed in 2013 by Ulf Arup, Patrik Frödén, and Ulrik Søchting, with Cerothallia luteoalba assigned as the type species. The type is more widely distributed, as it is also found in Europe and North America. The generic name Cerothallia means "with waxy thallus".

Species

Cerothallia luteoalba 
Cerothallia subluteoalba 
Cerothallia yarraensis 
Cerothallia yorkensis

References

Teloschistales
Teloschistales genera
Taxa described in 2013
Lichen genera